Carvers is an unincorporated community in Bladen County, North Carolina, United States.

History
Oakland Plantation is listed on the National Register of Historic Places.

Notes

Unincorporated communities in Bladen County, North Carolina
Unincorporated communities in North Carolina